Theodore Robert Armstrong (June 17, 1933 – January 5, 2016) was an American basketball player.

Born in Detroit, Michigan, he played collegiately for Michigan State University.

He was selected by the Rochester Royals in the 1955 NBA draft.

He played for the Philadelphia Warriors (1956–1957) in the NBA for 19 games.

References

External links 

1933 births
2016 deaths
Basketball players from Detroit
Michigan State Spartans men's basketball players
Philadelphia Warriors players
Rochester Royals draft picks
Holland High School (Michigan) alumni
American men's basketball players
Centers (basketball)
Power forwards (basketball)